"Do You Mind" is a song by British singer Kyla. It was released as a digital download in the United Kingdom in 2008. The song peaked at number 48 on the UK Singles Chart in 2009.

Samples
"Do You Mind (Crazy Cousinz Remix)" was later heavily sampled in Drake's "One Dance" (2016) which peaked at number-one in the UK, US and Canada.

"Do You Mind" was sampled on ArrDee's 2022 single "Hello Mate", with Kyla being credited as a featured artist. The single peaked at number 37 on the UK charts.

Charts

References

2008 songs
2008 singles
Kyla (British singer) songs